

Wulfsige was a medieval Bishop of London.

Wulfsige was consecrated between 897 and 900. He died between 909 and 926.

Citations

References

External links
 

Bishops of London
10th-century English bishops
10th-century deaths
Year of birth unknown
Year of death unknown